Michael James "Mickey" Devine (26 May 1954 – 20 August 1981) was a volunteer in the Irish National Liberation Army (INLA). He was the last hunger striker to die in prison during the 1981 Irish hunger strike.

Background
Devine, also known as Red Mickey because of his red hair, was born into a family from the Springtown Camp, Derry, Northern Ireland.

In 1960, when Devine was six years of age, the Devine family including his grandmother, sister Margaret and parents Patrick and Elizabeth, moved to the then newly built Creggan estate to the north of Derry city centre. Devine was educated at Holy Child Primary School and St. Joseph's Secondary School, both in the Creggan.

Political activities

In July 1971, soldiers from the Royal Anglian Regiment fired into a crowd of approximately 70 people stoning them, fatally wounding two civilians, Dessie Beattie and Seamus Cusack. After this incident, Devin joined the James Connolly branch of the Republican Clubs in Derry. The events of Bloody Sunday on 14 January 1972 had a deep impact on Devine. In the early 1970s, Devine joined the Irish Labour Party and Young Socialists.

Paramilitary activity
Devine helped found the INLA in 1974. On 20 September 1976, after an arms raid in County Donegal of the Republic of Ireland, Devine was arrested along with Desmond Walmsley and John Cassidy in Lifford, County Donegal. He was charged with the theft of rifles, shotguns and possession of 3,000 rounds of ammunition. On 20 July 1977 Devine was convicted and sentenced to 12 years in prison. He joined the blanket protest before joining the hunger strike.

Hunger strikes
Devine participated in a brief hunger strike in 1980, which was called off without fatalities. On 22 June 1981, Devine joined the 1981 hunger strike at the Maze Prison. He became the INLA prisoners' Officer Commanding in Maze Prison when his friend and comrade Patsy O'Hara began his hunger strike. Devine died on 20 August 1981, the tenth and last of the hunger strikers to die. The funeral took place two days later, on 22 August, in his native city of Derry. He was buried in a grave next to Patsy O'Hara, who died three months before. After the Requiem offered in St Mary's chapel, the funeral took place from Devine's sister's home, in Rathkeele Way, to the cemetery.

References

External links
Text of Clarke Sunday Times article, 5 April 2009

1954 births
1981 deaths
Irish National Liberation Army members
Irish republicans
Official Irish Republican Army members
People of The Troubles (Northern Ireland) from Derry (city)
People who died on the 1981 Irish hunger strike